This is a list of state leaders in the 9th century (801–900) AD.

Africa

Africa: Northeast

Makuria (complete list) –
Mikhael, King (c.785/794–804/813)
Ioannes, King (early–mid 9th century)
Zakharias III, King (mid 9th century)
Georgios I, King (late 9th–early 10th century)

Africa: Northcentral

Rustamid dynasty (complete list) –
ʿAbdu l-Wahhab ibn Abd ar-Rahman, Imam (788–824)
Aflah ibn ʿAbdi l-Wahhab, Imam (824–872)
Abu Bakr ibn Aflah, Imam (872–874)
Muhammad Abu l-Yaqzan ibn Aflah, Imam (874–894)
Yusuf Abu Hatim ibn Muhammad Abi l-Yaqzan, Imam (894–895, 899–906) 
Yaʿqub ibn Aflah, Imam (895–899)

Aghlabid Emirs
Ibrahim I ibn al-Aghlab ibn Salim (800–812)
Abdallah I ibn Ibrahim (812–817)
Ziyadat Allah I ibn Ibrahim(817–838)
al-Aghlab Abu Iqal ibn Ibrahim (838–841)
Muhammad I ibn al-Aghlab Abi Affan (841–856)
Ahmad ibn Muhammad (856–863)
Ziyadat Allah II ibn Muhammad (863)
Abu 'l-Gharaniq Muhammad II ibn Ahmad (863–875)
Abu Ishaq Ibrahim II ibn Ahmad (875–902)

Africa: Northwest

Barghawata (complete list) –
Ilyâs ibn Sâlih, King (792–842) 
Yunus ibn Ilyas, King (c.842–888)
Abu Ghafir Muhammad, King (c.888–917)

Idrisid dynasty of Morocco (complete list) –
Idris II, Emir (791–828)
Muhammad ibn Idris, Emir (828–836)
Ali ibn Idris, Emir (836–849)
Yahya ibn Muhammad, Emir (849–863)
Yahya ibn Yahya, Emir (863–866)
Ali ibn Umar, Emir (866–unknown)
Yahya ibn al-Qasim, Emir (unknown–905)

Emirate of Nekor (complete list) –
Sa'id I ibn Idris, Emir (760–803)
Salih II ibn Sa'id, Emir (803–864)
Sa'id II ibn Salih, Emir (864–916)

Americas

Americas: Mesoamerica

Maya civilization

Calakmul (complete list) –
Chan Pet, King (c. 849)

Copán (complete list) –
Yax Pasaj Chan Yopaat, King (763–post-810)
Ukit Took, King (822–?)
	
Palenque (complete list) –
Janaab Pakal III, Ajaw (799–?)

Tikal (complete list) –
Nuun Ujol K'inich, Ajaw (c.800)
Dark Sun, Ajaw (c.810)
Jewel K'awiil, Ajaw (c.849)
Jasaw Chan K'awiil II, Ajaw (c.869)

Asia

Asia: Central

Tibet

Tibetan Empire (complete list) –
Sadnalegs, Emperor (c.800/04–c.815)
Ralpacan, Emperor (815–836) 
Langdarma, Emperor (836–842)

Uzbekistan

Samanid Empire (complete list) –
Nuh ibn Asad, Amir (819–841)
Yahya ibn Asad, Amir (819–855)
Ahmad ibn Asad, Amir (819–864)
Ilyas ibn Asad, Amir (819–856)
Ibrahim ibn Ilyas, Amir (856–867)
Nasr I, Amir (864–892)
Isma'il ibn Ahmad, Amir (892–907)

Asia: East

Turks

Uyghur Khaganate (complete list) –
Ai tengride ülüg bulmïsh alp qutlugh ulugh bilge, Khagan (795–808)
Ai tengride qut bulmïsh külüg bilge, Khagan (808–821)
Kün tengride ülüg bulmïsh alp küchlüg bilge, Khagan (821–824)
Ai tengride qut bulmïsh alp bilge, Khagan (824–832)
Ai tengride qut bulmïsh alp külüg bilge, Khagan (832–839)
Kürebir, Khagan (839–840)
Öge, Khagan (841–847)

China

Tang dynasty (complete list) –
Dezong, Emperor (780–805)
Shunzong, Emperor (805)
Xianzong, Emperor (806–820)
Muzong, Emperor (821–824)
Jingzong, Emperor (824–826)
Wenzong, Emperor (826–840)
Wuzong, Emperor (840–846)
Xuānzong, Emperor (846–859)
Yizong, Emperor (859–873)
Xizong, Emperor (873–888)
Zhaozong, Emperor (888–904)

Japan

Heian period Japan (complete list) –
Kanmu, Emperor (781–806)
Heizei, Emperor (806–809)
Saga, Emperor (809–823)
Junna, Emperor (823–833)
Ninmyō, Emperor (833–850)
Montoku, Emperor (850–858)
Seiwa, Emperor (858–876)
Yōzei, Emperor (876–884)
Kōkō, Emperor (884–887)
Uda, Emperor (887–897)
Daigo, Emperor (897–930)

Korea: North–South States Period

Balhae (complete list) –
Gang, King (794–809)
Jeong, King (809–812)
Hui, King (812–817)
Gan, King (817–818)
Seon, King (818–830)
Dae Ijin, King (830–857)
Dae Geonhwang, King (857–871)
Dae Hyeonseok, King (871–894)
Dae Wihae, King (894–906)

Later Silla (complete list) –
Aejang, King (800–809)
Heondeok, King (809–826)
Heungdeok, King (826–836)
Huigang, King (836–838)
Minae, King (838–839)
Sinmu, King (839)
Munseong, King (839–857)
Heonan, King (857–861)
Gyeongmun, King (861–875)
Heongang, King (875–886)
Jeonggang, King (886–887)
Jinseong, King (887–897)
Hyogong, King (897–912)

Asia: Southeast

Indonesia: Java

Mataram Kingdom: Shailendra dynasty/Sanjaya dynasty (complete list) –
Samaragrawira, King (800—819)
Samaratungga, King (812—833)
Pramodhawardhani, Queen (833—856)
Rakai Pikatan, King (838—850)
Balaputra, King (835–860)
Balitung, King (899–911)

Sunda Kingdom (complete list) –
Pucukbumi Darmeswara, Maharaja (795–819)
Prabu Gajah Kulon Rakeyan Wuwus, Maharaja (819–891)
Prabu Darmaraksa, Maharaja (891–895)
Windusakti Prabu Dewageng, Maharaja (895–913)

Malaysia: Peninsular

Kedah Sultanate (complete list) –
Maha Jiwa, Maharaja (c.788–832)
Karma II, Maharaja (c.832–880)
Darma Raja II, Maharaja (c.880–956)

Thailand

Ngoenyang (complete list) –
Lao Gab, King (8th–9th century)

Vietnam

Champa (complete list) –
Indravarman I, King (c.787–c.803)

Asia: South

Afghanistan

Ghurid dynasty (complete list) –
Amir Suri, Malik (9th–10th century)

Turk Shahi (complete list) –
Pati Dumi, King (?–815)
Lagaturman, King (815–c.850)

Bengal and Northeast India

Chavda dynasty (complete list) –
Vanaraja Chavda, King (c.765–780)
Yogaraja, King (c.806–841)
Ratnaditya, King (c.842–845)
Vairisimha, King (c.845–856)
Kshemaraja, King (c.856–880)
Chamunda or Bhuyada, King (c.881–908)

Kamarupa: Mlechchha dynasty (complete list) –
Salambha, King (795–815)
Harjjaravarman, King (815–832)
Vanamalavarman, King (832–855)
Jayamala, King (855–860)
Balavarman III, King (860–880)
Tyagasimha, King (890–900)

Mallabhum (complete list) –
Kharga Malla, King (841–862)

Pala Empire (complete list) –
Dharmapala, King (8th–9th century)
Devapala, King (9th century)
Mahendrapala, King (9th century)
Shurapala I, King (9th century)
Vigrahapala I, King (9th century)
Narayanapala, King (9th–10th century)

India

Chahamanas of Shakambhari (complete list) –
Govindaraja I, King (c.809–836)
Chandraraja II, King (c.836–863)
Govindaraja II, King (c.863–890)
Chandanaraja, King (c.890–917)

Chandelas of Jejakabhukti (complete list) –
Nannuka, King (c.831–845)
Vakpati, King (c.845–865)
Jayashakti (Jayaśakti) and Vijayashakti, King (c.865–885)
Rahila, King (c.885–905)

Eastern Chalukyas (complete list) –
Vishnuvardhana IV, King (772–808)
Vijayaditya II, King (808–847)
Kali Vishnuvardhana V, King (847–849)
Vijayaditya III, King (849–892)
Chalukya Bhima I, King (892–921)

Chera/Perumals of Makotai (complete list) –
Rama Rajasekhara, King (c.800–844)
Sthanu Ravi Varma, King (c.844–883)
Goda Ravi, King (c.883–913)

Chola dynasty (complete list) –
Vijayalaya Chola, King (c.850–870)
Aditya I, King (870–907)

Eastern Ganga dynasty (complete list) –
Anantavarman III, King (c.808–812)
Rajendravarman II, King (c.812–840)
Devendravarman IV, King (893–?)
Devendravarman V, King (c.885–895)
Gunamaharnava I, King (c.895–939)
Vajrahasta II (or Anangabhimadeva I), King (c.895–939)

Western Ganga dynasty (complete list) –
Shivamara II, King (788–816) 
Rachamalla I, King (816–843) 
Ereganga Neetimarga, King (843–870)
Rachamalla II, King (870–907)

Gurjara-Pratihara dynasty (complete list) –
Nagabhata II, King (800–833)
Ramabhadra, King (833–836)
Mihira Bhoja, King (836–885)
Mahendrapala I, King (885–910)

Kalachuris of Tripuri (complete list) –
Lakshmanaraja I, King (825–850)
Kokalla I, King (850–890)
Shankaragana II, King (890–910)

Kumaon Kingdom: Katyuri (complete list) –
Basantana Dev, King (850–870)
Kharpar Dev, King (870–880)
Abhiraj Dev, King (880–890)
Tribhuvanraj Dev, King (890–900)
Nimbarta Dev, King (900–915)

Pandyan dynasty (complete list) –
Parantaka Nedunjadaiyan, King (765–815)
Varagunan I, King (800–830)
Srimara Srivallabha, King (815–862) 
Varagunavarman II, King (862–880)
Parantaka Viranarayana, King (880–900)
Maravarman Rajasimha II, King (900–920)

Paramara dynasty of Malwa (complete list) –
The Pallava dynasty has two chronologies of rulers.
Dantivarman, King (late 8th–early 9th century)

Nandivarman III, King (mid 9th century)
Nirupathungan, King (late 9th century, only in Aiyangar chronology)
Aparajitavarman, King (882/879–897)
The Pallava dynasty has two chronologies of rulers.
Upendra, King (c.800–c.818)
Vairisimha I, King (9th century)
Siyaka I, King (9th century)
Vakpati I, King (9th–10th century)

Rashtrakuta dynasty (complete list) –
Govinda III, King (793–814)
Amoghavarsha, King (814–878)
Krishna II, King (878–914)

Sisodia (complete list) –
Bhathabhatt, Rajput (790–813)
Rawal singh, Rajput (813–820)
Khumman II, Rajput (820–853)
Mahayak, Rajput (853–878)

Sri Lanka

Anuradhapura Kingdom, Sri Lanka (complete list) –
Mahinda II, King (787–807)
Dappula II, King (807–812)
Mahinda III, King (812–816)
Aggabodhi VIII, King (816–827)
Dappula III, King (827–843)
Aggabodhi IX, King (843–846)
Sena I, King (846–866)
Sena II, King (866–901)

Asia: West

Mesopotamia

Abbasid Caliphate, Baghdad (complete list) –
Harun al-Rashid, Caliph (786–809)
al-Amin, Caliph (809–813)
al-Ma'mun, Caliph (813–833)
al-Mu'tasim, Caliph (833–842)
al-Wathiq, Caliph (842–847)
al-Mutawakkil, Caliph (847–861)
al-Muntasir, Caliph (861–862)
al-Musta'in, Caliph (862–866)
al-Mu'tazz, Caliph (866–869)
al-Muhtadi, Caliph (869–870)
al-Mu'tamid, Caliph (870–892)
al-Mu'tadid, Caliph (892–902)

Persia

Saffarid dynasty (complete list) –
Ya'qub ibn al-Layth al-Saffar, Amir (861–879)
Amr ibn al-Layth, Amir (879–901)

Samanid Empire (complete list) –
Nuh ibn Asad, Amir (819–841)
Yahya ibn Asad, Amir (819–855)
Ahmad ibn Asad, Amir (819–864)
Ilyas ibn Asad, Amir (819–856)
Ibrahim ibn Ilyas, Amir (856–867)
Nasr I, Amir (864–892)
Isma'il ibn Ahmad, Amir (892–907)

Yemen

Yemeni Zaidi State (complete list) –
Muhammad ibn Ja'far al-Sadiq, Imam (783–818)
Muhammad ibn Ja'far al-Sadiq, Caliph (815-818)
al-Hadi ila'l-Haqq Yahya, Imam (897–911)

Europe

Europe: Balkans

First Bulgarian Empire (complete list) –
Kardam, Khan (777–803)
Krum, Khan (803–814)
Omurtag, Khan (814–831)
Malamir, Khan (831–836)
Presian I, Khan (836–852)
Boris I, Knyaz (852–889)
Vladimir, Knyaz (889–893)
Simeon I, Emperor (893–927)

Byzantine Empire (complete list) –
Irene, Regent (780–790, 792–797), Empress (797–802)
Nikephoros I, Emperor (802–811)
Staurakios, Co-Emperor (802–811), Emperor (811)
Michael I Rangabe, Emperor (811–813)
Theophylact, Co-Emperor (811–813)
Leo V the Armenian, Emperor (813–820)
Constantine (Symbatios), Junior Emperor (813–820)
Michael II the Amorian, Emperor (820–829)
Theophilos, Emperor (829–842)

Michael III, Emperor (842–867)
Basil I the Macedonian, Emperor (867–886)
Leo VI the Wise, Co-Emperor (870–886), Emperor (886–912)

Emirate of Crete (complete list) –
Abu Hafs Umar al-Iqritishi, Emir (827/828–c.855)
Shu'ayb ibn Umar, Emir (c.855–880)
Abu Abdallah Umar ibn Shu'ayb, Emir (c.880–895)
Muhammad ibn Shu'ayb al-Zarkun, Emir (c.895–910)

Duchy of Croatia (complete list) –
Višeslav, Duke (c.785–c.802)
Borna, Duke (c.810–821)
Vladislav, Duke (821–c.823)
Ljudemisl, Duke (c.823–c.835)
Mislav, Duke (c.835–c.845)
Trpimir I, Duke (845–864)
Domagoj, Duke (864–876)
Iljko, Duke (876–878)
Zdeslav, Duke (878–879)
Muncimir, Duke (892–910)

Principality of Serbia (complete list) –
Višeslav, King (814–822)
Radoslav, Prince (814–822)
Prosigoj, Prince (?–c.830)
Vlastimir, Prince (c.830–851)
Mutimir, Prince (c.850–891)
Pribislav, Prince (891–892)
Petar, Prince (892–917)

Europe: British Isles

Great Britain: Scotland

Dál Riata (complete list) –
Caustantín mac Fergusa, King (unknown)
Conall mac Taidg, King (c.805–807)
Conall mac Áedáin, King (c.807–811)
Domnall mac Caustantín, King (c.811–835)
Óengus II, King (unknown)
Eóganán mac Óengusa, King (unknown)
Áed mac Boanta, King (c.835–839)
Alpín mac Echdach, King (unknown)
Cináed mac Ailpín, King (unknown)

Picts (complete list) –
Constantine (I), King (789–820)
Óengus II, King (820–834)
Drest IX, King (834–837)
Eóganan, King (837–839)
Uurad, competitor King (839–842)
Bridei VI, competitor King (842–843)
Ciniod II, competitor King (843)
Bridei VII, competitor King (843–845)
Drest X, competitor King (845–848)

The Picts, traditionally The Scots (complete list) –
Kenneth MacAlpin, King (843–858)
Domnall mac Ailpí, or Donald I, King (858–862)
Causantín mac Cináeda, or Constantine I (II), King (862–877)
Áed mac Cináeda, King (877–878)
Giric, King (878–889)
Eochaid, disputed King (c.878–889)
Donald II, King (889–900)
Constantine II (III), King (900–943)

Kingdom of Strathclyde / Alt Clut (complete list) –
Cynan, King (798–816)
Dumnagual IV, King (816–?)
Constantine, King (? 859)
Neithon, King (859–?)
Artgal, King (?–872)
Run, King (872–878)
Eochaid, King (uncertain)
Donald I, King (889–900)
Donald II, King (889–900)
Constantine II (III), King (900–943)

Lochlann –
Gofraid of Lochlann, King (pre-872–873)

Isle of Man (complete list) –
Gwriad, King (?–825)
Merfyn Frych, King (825–836)

Kingdom of the Isles (complete list) –
Ketill Flatnose, King (9th century)

Great Britain: Northumbria

Kingdom of Northumbria (complete list) –
Eardwulf, King (796–806/808)
Ælfwald II, King (806/808–808/810)
Eanred, King (810–841)
Æthelred II, King (840/841–844, 858–862)
Redwulf, King (844)
Osberht, King (844–848/849, 867)
Ælla II, King (862/863–867)

Norse era Northumbria / Scandinavian York (complete list) –
Ecgberht, King (867–872)
Ricsige, King (872–876)
Halfdan Ragnarsson, King (876–877)
Interregnum
Guthfrith I, King (c.883–895)
Siefredus, King (c.895–900)
Cnut, King (c.900–905)

Great Britain: England

The Britons (complete list) –
Cynan Dindaethwy, King (798–816)
Merfyn Frych, King (825–844)
Rhodri ap Merfyn, King (844–878)
Anarawd ap Rhodri, King (878–916)

Kingdom of East Anglia (complete list) –
Cœnwulf, King (?–821), also King of Kent and of Mercia
Ceolwulf, King (821–823), also King of Kent and of Mercia
Beornwulf, King (823–826), also King of Mercia
Æthelstan, King post-827–840s)
Æthelweard, King (840s–854)
Edmund the Martyr, King (855–869)
Oswald, Sub-King (870s)
Æthelred II, Sub-King (870s)
Guthrum, King (879–890)
Eohric, King (890–902)

Kingdom of Essex (complete list) –
Sigered
King (798–812)
Duke (812–825)

Kingdom of Kent (complete list) –
Cuthred, King (797/798–807)
Coenwulf, King (fl. 809)
Ceolwulf I, King (fl. 822–823)
Baldred, King (?–825)
Egbert, King (825–839)
Æthelwulf, King (825–858)
Æthelstan, King (fl. 839–851)
Æthelberht, King (fl. 855–866)
Æthelred, King (866–871)

Mercia (complete list –
Coenwulf, King (796–821), also King of Kent and of East Anglia
Ceolwulf I, King (821–823), also King of Kent and of East Anglia
Beornwulf, King (823–826), also King of East Anglia
Ludeca, King (826–827)
Wiglaf, King (827–829, 830–839)
Ecgberht, King (829–830)
Wigmund, King (c.840)
Ælfflæd, Regent (c.840)
Beorhtwulf, King (840–852)
Burgred, King (852–874)
Ceolwulf II, King (874–c.879)
Æthelred II, Lord (c.881–911)

Kingdom of Wessex (complete list) –
Beorhtric, King (786–802)
Egbert, King (802–839)
Æthelwulf, King (839–858)
Æthelbald, King (858–860)
Æthelberht, King (860–865)
Æthelred, King (865–871)
Alfred the Great, King (871–899)
Edward the Elder, King (899–924)

Great Britain: Wales

Glywysing (complete list) –
Arthfael Hen ap Rhys, King (785–c.825)
Rhys ap Arthfael, King (c.830–c.840)
Hywel ap Rhys, King (c.840–886)
Owain ap Hywel, King (886–c.930)

Gwent (complete list) –
Athrwys ap Ffernfael, King (774–810)
Idwallon ap Gwrgant, King (810–842)
Ithel ap Hywel, King (842–848)
Meurig ap Hywel, King (848–849)
Meurig ap Arthfael Hen, King (849–874)
Ffernfael ap Meurig, King (874–880)
Brochfael ap Meurig, King (880–920)

Kingdom of Gwynedd (complete list) –
Cynan Dindaethwy ap Rhodri, King (c.798–816)
Hywel ap Rhodri Molwynog, King (814–825)
Merfyn Frych, King (825–844)
Rhodri the Great, King (844–878)
Anarawd ap Rhodri, King (878–916)

Seisyllwg –
, King (770–807)
Gwgon ap Meurig, King (808–872)
Cadell ap Rhodri, King (872–909)

Kingdom of Powys (complete list) –
Cadell ap Brochfael, King (773–808)
Cyngen ap Cadell, King (808–854)
Rhodri Mawr, King (854–878)
Merfyn ap Rhodri, King (878–900)
Llywelyn ap Merfyn, King (900–942)

Ireland

Ireland (complete list) –
Áed Oirdnide, High King (793–817)
Conchobar mac Donnchada, High King (819–833)
Fedelmid mac Crimthainn, High King (836–841)
Niall Caille, High King (832–846)
Máel Sechnaill mac Máele Ruanaid, High King (846–860)
Áed Findliath, High King (861–876)
Flann Sinna, High King (877–914)

Kingdom of Ailech (complete list) –
Áed Oirdnide mac Néill, King (788–819)
Murchad mac Máele Dúin, King (819–823)
Niall Caille mac Áeda, King (823–846)
Máel Dúin mac Áeda, King (846–?)
Áed Findliath mac Néill, King (c.855–879)
Murchad mac Máele Dúin, King (879–887)
Flaithbertach mac Murchado, King (887–896)
Domnall mac Áeda, King (887–915)
Niall Glúndub mac Áeda, King (896–919)

Airgíalla (complete list) –
Cu Masach mac Cathal, King (?–825)
Gofraidh mac Fearghus, King (fl.835)
Foghartaigh mac Mael Breasal, King (?–850/852)
Congalach mac Finnachta, King (?–874)
Mael Padraig mac Mael Curarada, King (?–882)
Maol Craoibh ua Duibh Sionach, King (?–917)

Kingdom of Breifne (complete list) –
Muircheartach mac Donnghal, King (c.800–806)
Mael Dúin mac Échtgal, King (?–822)
Ceallach son of Cearnach, King (?)
Tighearnán mac Seallachan, King (c.888)
Ruarc mac Tighearnáin, Lord (c.893)

Connachta (complete list) –
Muirgius mac Tommaltaig, King (796–815)
Diarmait mac Tommaltaig, King (815–833)
Cathal mac Muirgiussa, King (833–839)
Murchad mac Áedo, King (839–840)
Fergus mac Fothaid, King (840–843)
Conchobar mac Taidg Mór, King (872–882)
Áed mac Conchobair, King (882–888)
Tadg mac Conchobair, King (888–900)
Cathal mac Conchobair, King (900–925)

Kingdom of Dublin (complete list) –
Amlaíb Conung, King (c.853–871)
Ímar, King (c.857–873)
Auisle, King (c.863–867)
Oistin mac Amlaíb, possibly king (873–875)
Halfdan Ragnarsson, disputed king (875–877)
Bárid mac Ímair, King (873–881)
Sichfrith mac Ímair, King (?–888)
Sitriuc mac Ímair, King (?–896)
Sichfrith Jarl, disputed king (893–?)
Glúniarann, King (c.895)
Ímar ua Ímair, King (?–904)

Leinster (complete list) –
Fínsnechta Cethardec, King (795–808)
Muiredach mac Brain (died 818), King (808–818)
Muiredach mac Ruadrach, King (818–829)
Cellach mac Brain, King (829–834)
Bran mac Fáeláin, King (834–838)
Túathal mac Máele-Brigte, King (851–854)
Ruarc mac Brain, King (854–862)
Muirecán mac Diarmata, King (862–863)
Dúnlaing mac Muiredaig, King (863–869)
Ailill mac Dúnlainge (died 871), King (869–871)
Domnall mac Muirecáin, King (871–884)
Muiredach mac Brain, King (884–885)
Cerball mac Muirecáin, King (885–909)

Kingdom of Meath (complete list) –
Muiredach mac Domnaill Midi, King (799–802)
Diarmait mac Donnchado, King (802–803)
Conchobar mac Donnchado, King (803–833)
Niall mac Diarmato, King (?–826)
Máel Ruanaid mac Donnchada Midi, King (833–843)
Fland mac Maele Ruanaid, King (843–845)
Máel Sechnaill mac Maíl Ruanaid, King (845–862)
Lorcán mac Cathail, King (862–864)
Conchobar mac Donnchado, King (?–864)
Donnchad mac Aedacain, King (864–877)
Flann Sinna mac Maíl Sechnaill, King (877–916)

Uí Maine (complete list) –
Dub Dá Leithe mac Tomaltach, King (?–816)
Cathal mac Murchadh, King (794–816)
Cathal mac Ailell, King (834–844)
Mughroin mac Sochlachan, King (?–904)

Ulaid / Ulster (complete list) –
Eochaid mac Fiachnai, King (790–810)
Cairell mac Fiachnai, King (810–819)
Máel Bressail mac Ailillo, King (819–825)
Muiredach mac Eochada, King (825–839)
Matudán mac Muiredaig, King (839–857)
Lethlobar mac Loingsig, King (857–873)
Cathalán mac Indrechtaig, King (857–871)
Ainbíth mac Áedo, King (873–882)
Eochocán mac Áedo, King (882–883)
Airemón mac Áedo, King (882–886)
Fiachnae mac Ainbítha, King (886–886)
Bécc mac Airemóin, King (886–893)
Muiredach mac Eochocáin, King (893–895)
Máel Mocheirge mac Indrechtaig, King (893–896)
Aitíth mac Laigni, King (896–898)
Cenn Etig mac Lethlobair, King (896–900)
Áed mac Eochocáin, King (898–919)

Europe: Central

East Francia, later Kingdom of Germany (complete list) –
Louis the German, King (843–876)
Louis the Younger, King (880–882)
Charles the Fat, King (882–887)
Arnulf, King (887–899)
Louis the Child, King (899–911)

Duchy of Alsace (see also) –
Charles, Duke (829–831)
Hugh, Duke (867–885)

Prince-Bishopric of Augsburg (complete list) –
Adalbero, Prince-bishop (887–909)

Duchy of Bavaria (complete list) –
Louis II the German, King (817–843)	
Carloman, King (876–880)	
Louis III the Younger, King (880–882)	
Charles the Fat, King (882–887)	
Engeldeo, Margrave (890–895)	
Luitpold, Margrave (895–907)

Bohemians –
Lech, Prince (?–805)

Duchy of Bohemia (complete list) –
Bořivoj I (c.867–c.889)
Spytihněv I (c.894–915)

March of Carinthia –
Gundachar, Margrave (858–863), Prefect (863–869)

Duchy of Franconia (complete list) –
Henry, Margrave (882–892)

County of Hainaut (complete list) –
Reginar I, Count (870–898, 908–915)
Sigard, Count (898–908)

County of Frisia / County of Holland (complete list) –
Gerolf, Count (880–896)
Dirk I, Count (896–931)

Lotharingia (complete list) –
Lothair II, King (855–869)
Charles the Bald, King (869–870)
Louis the Younger, King (880–882)
Charles the Fat, King (882–887)
Arnulf of Carinthia, King (887–895)
Zwentibold, King (895–900)
Louis the Child, King (900–911)

Magyar tribes (complete list) –
Álmos, Grand Prince (c.850–c.895)
Árpád, Grand Prince (c.895–c.907)

Prince-Bishopric of Mainz (complete list) –
Richholf, Prince-archbishop (787–813)
Adolf, Prince-archbishop (813–826)
Odgar, Prince-archbishop (826–847)
Rabanus Maurus, Prince-archbishop (848–856)
Karl, Prince-archbishop (856–863)
Ludbert, Prince-archbishop (863–889)
Sunderhold, Prince-archbishop (889–891)
Hatto I, Prince-archbishop (891–913)

Great Moravia (complete list) – 
Mojmir I, Duke (c.830–846)
Rastislav, Duke (846–870)
Slavomir, Duke (871)
Svatopluk I, Duke (870–871, (871–pre-885), King (pre-885–894)
Mojmír II, Duke (894–906)

Margraviate of the Nordgau –
Ernest, Margrave (?–861)
Rodold, Margrave (861–c.880)
Engeldeo, Margrave (c.880–895)
Luitpold, Margrave (895–903)

Obotrites (complete list) –
Thrasco, Prince (?–c.800)
Slavomir, Prince (pre-810–819)
Ceadrag, Prince (819–post-826)
Selibur, Prince (9th century?)

Duchy of Saxony (complete list) –
Abo, Duke (fl.c.785–811)
Widukind, Duke (fl.c.777–810)
Liudolf I, Duke (850–864/866)
Bruno, Duke (864/866–880)
Otto I, Duke (880–912)

March of Pannonia (complete list) –
Radbod, Margrave/Prefect (833–854)
Carloman of Bavaria, Margrave/Prefect (856–?)
William, co-Margrave (?–871)
Engelschalk I, co-Margrave (?–871)
Aribo, Margrave (871–909)
Engelschalk II, Margrave in opposition (c.871–893)
Luitpold, Margrave (893–907)

Sorbs –
Miliduch, Duke (fl.790–806)
Tunglo, Duke (?–826)
Czimislav, King (fl.830–840)
Čestibor, King (c.840–859)
Slavibor, Prince (c.859–894)
Dragomir, Prince (894–?)

Prince-Bishopric of Speyer (complete list) –
Goddank, Prince-bishop (881–895/898)
Einhard, Prince-bishop (895/898–913)

Landgraviate of Sundgau –
Hugo, Graf, Count (866–869)
Liutfrid, Count (876–902)

Duchy of Thuringia (complete list) –
Thachulf, Duke (849–873)
Radulf II, Duke (874–880)
Poppo, Duke (880–892)
Egino, Duke (882–886)
Conrad, Duke (892–906)

Elector-Bishopric of Trier (complete list) –
Radbod, Prince-bishop (898–915)

Prince-Bishopric of Worms (complete list) –
Gunzo, Prince-bishop (859–872)
Adelhelm, Prince-bishop (873–890)
Dietlach, Prince-bishop (890–914)

Europe: East

Volga Bulgaria (complete list) –
Tuqyi, ruler (765–815)
Aidar, ruler (815–865)
Şilki, Iltäbär (865–882)
Batyr Mö'min, ruler (882–895)
Almış, Emir (895–925)

Khazar Khaganate (complete list) –
Ashina dynasty: Khazar Khagans
Khan-Tuvan, Khagan (c.825–830)
Tarkhan, Khagan (840s)
Zachariah, Khagan (c.861)
Bulanid dynasty
Obadiah, ruler (c.786–809)
Hezekiah, ruler (mid 9th-century)
Manasseh I, ruler (mid 9th-century)
Chanukkah, ruler (mid 9th-century)
Isaac, ruler (late 9th-century)
Zebulun, ruler (late 9th-century)
Manasseh II, ruler (late 9th-century)
Nisi ben Menasseh, ruler (late 9th-century)
Aaron I, ruler (c.900)

Slavs of Lower Pannonia –
Vojnomir, Duke (c.790–810)
Ljudevit (Lower Pannonia), Duke (c.810–823)
Ratimir, Duke (c.829–838)
Pribina, Prince (c.846–861)
Kocel, Prince (c.861–c.876)
Braslav, Duke (c.882–896)

Europe: Nordic

Kingdom of Norway (872–1397) (complete list) –
Harald Fairhair, King (c.872–930)

Kingdom of Sweden (complete list) –
Björn Ironside, King (early 9th century)
Erik Björnsson, King (early 9th century)
Erik Refilsson, King (early 9th century)
Anund Uppsale, King (early 9th century)
Björn at Hauge, King (c.829–831)
Olof I of Sweden, King (mid 9th century)
Erik Anundsson, King (mid 9th century)

Europe: Southcentral

Holy Roman Empire in Italy

Kingdom of Italy (complete list) –
Pepin, King (781–810)
Bernard, King (810–818)
Louis I, King (818–822)
Lothair I, King (822–855)
Louis II, King (844–875)
Charles II the Bald, King (875–877)
Carloman, King (877–879)
Charles III the Fat, King (879–887)
Integrum: Simultaneous claimants
Berengar I, King (888–896)
Guy of Spoleto, King (889–894)
Lambert of Spoleto, King (891–896)
Arnulf of Carinthia, King (894–899)
Ratold, sub-King (896)
Berengar I, King (896–924)
Lambert of Spoleto, King (896–898)
Louis III of Provence, King (900–905)

Principality of Benevento (complete list) –
Grimoald III, Prince (787–806)
Grimoald IV, Prince (806–817)
Sico I, Prince (817–832)
Sicard, Prince (832–839)
Radelchis I, Prince (839–851)
Radelgar, Prince (851–854)
Adelchis, Prince (854–878)
Waifer, Prince (878–881)
Radelchis II, Prince (881–884, 897–900)
Aiulf II, Prince (884–890)
Orso, Prince (890–891)
Guy, Prince (895–897)
Peter of Benevento, Regent (897)
Radelchis II, Prince (881–884, 897–900)
Atenulf I, Prince (900–910)

March of Istria –
John, Duke (c.804)

Papal States (complete list) –
Leo III, Pope (795–816)
Stephen IV, Pope (816–817)
Paschal I, Pope (817–824)
Eugene II, Pope (824–827)
Valentine, Pope (827)
Gregory IV, Pope (827–844)
Sergius II, Pope (844–847)
Leo IV, Pope (847–855)
Benedict III, Pope (855–858)
Nicholas I, Pope (858–867)
Adrian II, Pope (867–872)
John VIII, Pope (872–882)
Marinus I, Pope (882–884)
Adrian III, Pope (884–885)
Stephen V, Pope (885–891)
Formosus, Pope (891–896)
Boniface VI, Pope (896)
Stephen VI, Pope (896–897)
Romanus, Pope (897)
Theodore II, Pope (897)
John IX, Pope (898–900)
Benedict IV, Pope (900–903)

Duchy of Spoleto (complete list) –
Winiges, Duke (789–822)
Suppo I, Duke (822–824)
Adelard, Duke (824)
Mauring, Duke (824)
Adelchis I, Duke (824–834)
Lambert of Nantes, Duke (834–836)
Berengar, Duke (836–841)
Guy I, Duke (842–859)
Lambert I, Duke (859–871)
Suppo II, Duke (871–876)
Lambert I, Duke (876–880)
Guy II, Duke (880–883)
Guy III, Duke (883–894)
Lambert II, Duke (894–898)
Guy IV, Duke (895–898)
Alberic I, Duke (898–922)
Pietro I Candiano, Doge (887–888)
Pietro Tribuno, Doge (888–912)

March of Tuscany (complete list) –
Boniface I, Margrave (812–813)
Boniface II, Margrave (828–834)
Aganus, Margrave (835–845)
Adalbert I, Margrave (847–886)
Adalbert II the Rich, Margrave (886–915)

Republic of Venice (complete list) –
Giovanni Galbaio, Doge (787–804)
Obelerio Antenoreo, Doge (804–811)
Agnello Participazio, Doge (811–827)
Giustiniano Participazio, Doge (827–829)
Giovanni I Participazio, Doge (829–837)
Pietro Tradonico, Doge (837–864)
Orso I Participazio, Doge (864–881)
Giovanni II Participazio, Doge (881–887)
Pietro I Candiano, Doge (887–888)
Pietro Tribuno, Doge (888–912)

Europe: Southwest

Iberian Peninsula

Kingdom of Asturias (complete list) –
Alfonso II, King (791–842)
Nepotian, King (842)
Ramiro I, King (842–850)
Ordoño I, King (850–866)
Alfonso III, King (866–910)

Emirate of Córdoba (complete list) –
al-Hakam I, Emir (796–822)
Abd ar-Rahman II, Emir (822–852)
Muhammad I, Emir (852–886)
Al-Mundhir, Emir (886–888)
Abdallah ibn Muhammad, Emir (888–912)

Marca Hispanica

County of Osona (complete list) –
Borrell, Count (798–820)
Rampon, Count (820–825)
Bernard, Count (825–826)
Aisso, Count (826–827)
Guillemó, Count (826–827)

County of Cerdanya (complete list) –
Borrell, Count (798–820)
Aznar Galíndez, Count (820–824)
Galindo Aznárez, Count (824–834)
Sunifred I, Count (834–848)
Solomon, Count (848–869)
Wilfred I the Hairy, Count (869–897)
Miró II, Count (897–927)

County of Urgell (complete list) –
Borrell, Count (798–820)
Aznar I Galíndez, Count (820–824)
Galindo I Aznárez, Count (824–834)
Sunifred I, Count (834–848)
Solomon (or Miró), Count (848–870)
Wilfred the Hairy, Count (870–897)
Sunifred II, Count (898–948)

Europe: West

Franks

Frankish Empire (complete list) –
Charlemagne, King (768–814), Holy Roman Emperor (800–814)
Louis I the Pious, King and Holy Roman Emperor (813–840)

Middle Francia

Middle Francia –
Lothair I, King (843–855)

Upper Burgundy (complete list) –
Lothar II, King (855–869)
Rudolph I, King (888–912)

Lotharingia (complete list) –
Lothair II, King (855–869)
Charles the Bald, King (869–870)
Louis the Younger, King (880–882)
Charles the Fat, King (882–887)
Arnulf of Carinthia, King (887–895)
Zwentibold, King (895–900)
Louis the Child, King (900–911)

West Francia

West Francia (complete list) –
Charles II, called the Bald, 843–877
Aquitaine: Charles the Child, 855–866; Louis the Stammerer, 866–877
Neustria: Louis the Stammerer, 856–877
Louis II, called the Stammerer, 877–879
Louis III, 879–882, jointly with
Carloman II, 879–884
Charles the Fat, 884–888, Emperor 881
Odo,* 888–898
Aquitaine: Ranulf II, 888–889 (Ramnulfid, not Carolingian)
Charles the Simple, King (898–922)

Duchy of Aquitaine (complete list) –
William I (893–918)

County of Artois (complete list) –
Odalric, Count (c.850s)
Altmar, Count (c.890s)
Adelelm, Count (?–932)

Auvergne (complete list) –
Guerin of Provence, Count (819–839)
Gerard, Count of Auvergne, Count (839–841)
William I, Count (841–846)
Bernard I, Count (846–858)

County of Boulogne (complete list) –
Baldwin I, Count (896–918)

Duchy of Brittany (complete list) –
Alan I (876–907)

Duchy of Burgundy (complete list) –
Richard the Justiciar (898–921)

Duchy of Gascony (complete list) –
Gassia II (893–c.930)

County of Paris (complete list) –
Stephen, Count (778–811)
Beggo, Count (815–816)
Leuthard I of Paris, Count (816)
Gerard II, Count (816)
Leuthard II of Paris, Count (816–?)
Conrad, Count (858–859)
Adalard, Count (877)

County of Poitou (complete list) –
Renaud, Count (795–843)
, Count (814–828)
Bernard II, Count (840–844)
Emenon, Count (828–839)
Ranulph I, Count (839–866)
Ranulph II, Count (866–890)
Robert I, Count (866–923)
Aymar, Count (892–902)
Ebalus, Count (890–893, 902–935)

Kingdom of Provence (complete list) –
Louis the Blind, King (887–928)

County of Toulouse (complete list) –
William of Gellone, Count (790–806)
Beggo, Count (806–816)
Berengar, Count (816–835)
Bernard of Septimania, Count (835–842)
Acfred, Count (842–843)
William of Septimania, Count (844–849)
Fredelon, Count (844–852)
Raymond I, Count (852–863)
Humfrid, Count (863–865)
Sunyer, Count (863–865)
Bernard II, Count (865–877)
Bernard III Plantapilosa, Count (877–886)
Odo, Count (886–918)
William II of Aquitaine, Count (858–862, 918–926)
Stephen, Count (862–863)
Bernard Plantapilosa, Count (864–886)
William I of Aquitaine, Count (886–918)

Eurasia: Caucasus

Kingdom of Abkhazia (complete list) –
Leon II, King (c.767–811)
Theodosius II, King (c.811–837)
Demetrius II, King (c.837–872)
George I, King (c.872–878)
Bagrat I, King (c.887–898)
Constantine III, King (c.898–916)

Arminiya (complete list) –
Yazid ibn Mazyad al-Shaybani, Emir (799–801)
Asad ibn Yazid al-Shaybani, Emir (801–802)
Muhammad ibn Yazid al-Shaybani, Emir (802–803)
Khuzayma ibn Khazim, Emir (803–?)
Asad ibn Yazid al-Shaybani, Emir (c. 810)
Ishaq ibn Sulayman, Emir (c. 813)
Khalid ibn Yazid ibn Mazyad, Emir (813–?)
Khalid ibn Yazid ibn Mazyad, Emir (828–832)
Khalid ibn Yazid ibn Mazyad, Emir (841)
Khalid ibn Yazid ibn Mazyad, Emir (c. 842–844)
Muhammad ibn Khalid al-Shaybani, Emir (c. 842/844–?)
Abu Sa'id Muhammad al-Marwazi, Emir (849–851)
Yusuf ibn Abi Sa'id al-Marwazi, Emir (851–852)
Muhammad ibn Khalid al-Shaybani, Emir (857–862)
Ali ibn Yahya al-Armani, Emir (862–863)
Isa ibn al-Shaykh al-Shaybani, Emir (870–878)

Bagratid Armenia (complete list) –
Ashot I, King (884–890)
Smbat I, King (890–912)

Kingdom of Hereti (complete list) –
Sahl Smbatean, Prince (815–840)
Adarnase I, Prince (840–865)
Hama I, Prince (865–893)
Adarnase II, King (897–943)

Principality of Iberia (complete list) –
Ashot I, Prince (813–830)
Bagrat I, Prince (842/843–876)
David I, Prince (876–881)
Gurgen I, Prince (881–891)

Kingdom of the Iberians (complete list) –
Adarnase IV, King (888–923)

First Kingdom of Kakheti (complete list) –
Juansher, Prince (786–807)
Grigol, Prince (786–827)
Vache Kvabulidze, Prince (827–839)
Samuel, Donauri, Prince (839–861)
Gabriel, Donauri, Prince (861–881)
Padla I Arevmaneli, Prince (881–893)
Kvirike I, Prince (893–918)

Klarjeti (complete list) –
Sumbat I Mampali, King (870–889)
Bagrat I, King (889–900)
David I, King (900–943)

Oceania

Easter Island

Easter Island (complete list) –
Ouaraa, King (c.800)
Koroharua, King (?)
Mahuta Ariiki, King (?)
Atua Ure Rangi, King (?)
Atuamata, King (?)
Uremata, King (?)

See also
 List of political entities in the 9th century

References 

Leaders
 
-